Lieutenant-Colonel John Lindley Marmion Dymoke MBE (1 September 1926 – 21 March 2015) was the hereditary  Queen's Champion from 1946 until his death in 2015. He was present, as champion, at the Coronation of Queen Elizabeth II in 1953 and acted as Standard-Bearer of the Union Flag.

Dymoke was the 34th holder of the Manor of Scrivelsby since the Norman Conquest. He was High Sheriff of Lincolnshire in 1979 and Vice Lord-Lieutenant of that county from 1991 to 2001.

References

1926 births
2015 deaths
Royal Lincolnshire Regiment officers
Members of the Order of the British Empire
Military personnel from Norwich
People from Scrivelsby
Royal Anglian Regiment officers
John
High Sheriffs of Lincolnshire